Sivagiri may refer to:

 Sivagiri, Erode, a town in Tamil Nadu
 Sivagiri, Tirunelveli, a town in Tamil Nadu
 Sivagiri, Kerala, where sage Sree Narayana Guru's tomb is located
 Shivagiri, an 85 feet tall statue of Lord Shiva in Bijapur, Karnataka